H Velorum is a triple star system in the constellation Vela, at a distance of approximately .

Their estimated orbital period is 646,000 years. The primary is a spectroscopic binary with two B-class main sequence stars in a 1.1-day orbit.

References

Vela (constellation)
B-type main-sequence stars
076805
Velorum, H
Spectroscopic binaries
076805
3574
Durchmusterung objects